Ethmia infelix is a moth in the family Depressariidae. It was described by Edward Meyrick in 1914. It is found in Turkey (Mardin) and northern Iraq (Kurdistan).

References

Moths described in 1914
infelix